On 5 March 2011, an Antonov An-148 passenger jet broke up in mid-air and crashed on the outskirts of Garbuzovo, a village in the Belgorod Oblast of Russia. All six crew members, the only people on board, were killed. The aircraft was on a demonstration flight prior to delivery to the Myanmar Air Force. The subsequent investigation concluded that the aircraft broke up after the crew allowed it to substantially exceed its maximum design speed during a practice emergency descent.

Accident
The An-148 was on a local demonstration flight from Pridacha Airport in Voronezh, Russia, where it had been built by aircraft manufacturer VASO. The aircraft was being readied for delivery to the Myanmar Air Force, two representatives of which were on board. The other four crew, all Russians, were two pilots and two engineers.

The wreckage was found strewn along a  track, after witnesses on the ground reported seeing parts of the airframe breaking off before impact. None of the six people on board survived.

Aircraft
The aircraft involved was a twinjet Antonov An-148-100E, c/n 41-03, carrying test registration 61708. It was operating its 32nd flight, in preparation for delivery to the Myanmar air force. Just days before the accident, the type had been granted extended certification.

Investigation
The Russian Ministry of Industry opened an investigation into the accident. A criminal investigation was launched by the Investigative Committee of Russia to decide whether violation of flight regulations occurred. The flight recorders were recovered, and the whole wreckage was transported to the VASO plant for examination.

The abnormal aerodynamic stress exceeded the strength of the airframe, inducing low-frequency oscillations that eventually resulted in structural failure and in-flight break-up. Contributing factors were lack of proper crew coordination in executing the emergency descent, deviations from recommended procedures and the misleading indications provided by basic flight instruments while outside normal operating conditions.

References

Aviation accidents and incidents in 2011
Aviation accidents and incidents in Russia
2011 disasters in Russia
Airliner accidents and incidents caused by in-flight structural failure
Accidents and incidents involving the Antonov An-148
March 2011 events in Russia